BPMC  may refer to:

 Banque Populaire Maroco Centrafricaine
 Barbuda People's Movement for Change
 Fenobucarb